The Journal of the Mechanics and Physics of Solids is a monthly peer-reviewed scientific journal covering research, theory, and practice concerning the properties of materials. The journal was established in 1952 by Rodney Hill and is published by Elsevier. As of October 2022, the editor-in-chief is Huajian Gao (Nanyang Technological University). According to the Journal Citation Reports, the journal has a 2021 impact factor of 5.582.

Abstracting and indexing
The journal is abstracted and indexed in:

See also
Solid mechanics
Materials science

References

External links

Materials science journals
Elsevier academic journals
Monthly journals
Publications established in 1952
English-language journals